Halliday Public School District 19 is a school district headquartered in Halliday, North Dakota.

The district is mostly in Dunn County, and has a small section in Mercer County.

History
In 2002 the district leadership considered merging the district with Killdeer Public School District of Killdeer. Even though Halliday had athletic partnerships with the Dodge and Golden Valley districts, it would not have been able to consolidate with Dodge or Golden Valley because, at that time, if the three had consolidated, they would have had about 194 students. The North Dakota Legislature mandated that a consolidation should result in a school with at least 225 students to ensure that consolidations cause meaningfully large schools to result.

Halliday voters ultimately voted down the plan to consolidate with Killdeer. Therefore parents of 39 children residents in Halliday requested permission to send their children to Killdeer. As North Dakota districts allowed districts to restrict how many children are sent by parents to public schools outside of their districts, a group of parents attempted to persuade the North Dakota Legislature in changing the laws governing how many students may attend schools outside of their school districts. The administration of Halliday schools did not interfere with them withdrawing their children even though the parents did not succeed in having the law concerning children attending out of district changed. In the 2002-2003 school year there were 79 students in Halliday. However for the 2003-2004 school year this number dropped to 34. This would mean $70,000 fewer in revenue. Area parents had asked the Halliday board to pay the tuition for the students to go to school in Killdeer. Gene Buresh, a lawyer representing 15 groups of parents, stated that there were concerns regarding the lower amount of the budget and the declining number of students as those metrics could impact the district's compliance with U.S. Department of Education requirements.

By 2003 four members of the school board, including the board president, had resigned, leading to a change in the board.

Later in the 2000s enrollment numbered above 20. By 2010 there were 15 students with five in the twelfth grade, and there were more employees than students. Dale Gilje, the superintendent, suggested closing the school. In the 2009-2010 school year, 40 students residing in the Halliday district went to Killdeer schools and six went to Richardton-Taylor Public School District schools.

Academic performance
In 2003 the superintendent, Merlin Dahl, stated that students were performing above the North Dakota average and/or had satisfactory performance, citing test scores generated close to that year.

Athletics
In 2002 the district had common athletic teams with Dodge and Golden Valley, but by then was trying to cancel these agreements to prepare for a merger with Killdeer.

References

External links
 

School districts in North Dakota
Dunn County, North Dakota
Education in Mercer County, North Dakota